Macedonian cuisine (Greek: Μακεδονική κουζίνα) is the cuisine of the region of Macedonia in northern Greece. Contemporary Greek Macedonian cooking shares much with general Greek and wider Balkan and Mediterranean cuisine, including dishes from the Ottoman past. Specific influences include dishes of the Anatolian Greek, Aromanian and Megleno-Romanian, Slavic, Armenian and Sephardi Jewish population. The mix of the different people inhabiting the region gave the name to the Macedonian salad.

History

A continuation from the ancient period are dishes such as lamb cooked with quince or various vegetables and fruits, goat boiled or fried in olive oil: modern recipes from Kavala to Kastoria and Kozani offer lamb with quince, pork with celery or leeks.

The arrival of Greek refugees from Asia Minor and Constantinople in the early 20th century brought also Anatolian and Constantinopolitan elements in the cuisine of the region. 

Some current specialties are trahanas with crackling, phyllo-based pies (cheese, leek, spinach) and meat plates (such as pork, wild boar and buffalo). Unlike Athens, the traditional pita bread for the popular souvlaki usually is not grilled, but rather fried. (Information included from 'Greek Gastronomy', GNTO, 2004)

Various products are produced from the buffalo meat. There is breeding especially around Lake Kerkini.

Appetizers/local products

 Ajvar (Florina), spicy dip
Krokos Kozanis (saffron)
Melintzanosalata
Kavourmas
Kolokythopita (zucchini pie)
Koulouri Thessalonikis (a type of simit)
Kichí of Kozani, a type of tyropita with cheese
Mushrooms (large production around Grevena region)
Manitaropita, mushrooms pie
Pinakotí, bread from Mount Athos
Pastourmas
Skordalia
Spanakorizo
Tahini
Taramosalata
Various cheeses, like Anevato, Kasseri, Manouri, Batzos, Metsovone, Petroto, Kefalograviera and Tirokafteri, a spicy cheese spread or dip made of whipped feta cheese with hot peppers and olive oil
Tirokroketes
Red peppers of Florina: can be roasted, sliced and served by adding olive oil and garlic

Specialties

 , lamb meat with quinces
 , lamb with spinach (Kavala)
 , pork meat with celery
  (Μάντζα), vegetables
 , meatballs with garlic sauce (Kastoria)
 , mushrooms soup
 
 , meat plate
 Mussels with saffron
 , amix of legumes
 , a type of 
 , cuttlefishes in wine
 , Souvlaki and Kontosouvli
 , fried pork
 , may be soup
 , wild boar meat
 , Christmas food in the region of Kozani, meat and rice in pickled cabbage-leaf
 Various dishes with buffalo meat

Desserts

Akanés (Serres)
Armenovíl/Armenonville (Thessaloniki)
Bougatsa
Halvas
Kourkoubinia
Laggites
Moustalevria
Moustopita
Pandespani
 Poniró, from Serres 
Roxákia 
Revaní (Veria)
Sáliaroi (Saliaria) from Kozani
 Spoon sweets
Trigona Thessalonikis

Drinks

 Frappé coffee, invented in Thessaloniki in 1957 
 Retsina
 Tsipouro 
 Wine.

See also
 Greek cuisine
 Greek restaurant
 Byzantine cuisine
 Ottoman cuisine
 Cuisine of the Mediterranean

References

Sources

External links
 Moussaka from The English Times of Katerini
  Greek Macedonian Wines
  Greek Macedonian Wines (Info)

Macedonia (Greece)
Greek Macedonian cuisine